Galaxy is the tenth studio album by American band War. It was their first album released on MCA Records. The album was certified gold.

Critical reception 
Reviewing in Christgau's Record Guide: Rock Albums of the Seventies (1981), Robert Christgau wrote: "The first side of the most unambitious album they've ever made works beautifully as what it is—P-Funk on thorazine, with the phrasemaking acuity of previous War records reduced to one title, 'Sweet Fighting Lady.' Side two winds down from a pretty good hit single into fourteen minutes of carrying unambitiousness way too far."

Track listing
"Galaxy" – 8:11
"Baby Face (She Said Do Do Do Do)" – 5:04
"Sweet Fighting Lady" – 7:10
"Hey Señorita" – 5:47
"The Seven Tin Soldiers" – 14:15

Charts

Weekly charts

Year-end charts

References

1977 albums
War (American band) albums
albums produced by Jerry Goldstein (producer)